Milton Albert Wolf (May 29, 1924 – May 19, 2005) was an American diplomat, investment banker and real estate developer from Cleveland, Ohio.

Early life and education
Wolf earned a Bachelor of Science degree in civil engineering from the Case Institute of Technology, and a Masters and PhD in economics from Case Western Reserve University. He also held a bachelor's degree in chemistry and biology from Ohio State University.

Career
Wolf was a Jewish community leader and Democratic Party contributor. In 1977 he was appointed to serve as U.S. Ambassador to Austria by President Jimmy Carter, and held the position until 1980. During his tenure as ambassador to Austria, Wolf represented the United States in the U.N. Conference on Science and Technology, served as chairman of the Fulbright Committee of Austria, and was instrumental in arranging a meeting between President Carter and Soviet leader Leonid Brezhnev to sign the Strategic Arms Limitation Treaty (SALT II) in Vienna on June 19, 1979. Upon the conclusion of his diplomatic posting in 1980, Wolf founded a private investment firm Milton A. Wolf Investors. He was also president for 28 years of a construction company that developed several shopping centers and high-rise buildings in Cleveland, Ohio.

Personal life
His wife of 53 years, Rosyln, died in 2001. They had four children: a son, Leslie Wolf, and three daughters, Caryn Wolf Wechsler, Dr. Nancy Wolf, and Sherri Wolf. He died of lymphoma on May 19, 2005. The funeral was held at the Park Synagogue in Cleveland Heights, Ohio and he was buried in the Bet Olam Cemetery also in Cleveland Heights.

Decorations and awards
 Grand Decoration of Honour in Gold with Sash of the Order of Merit of the Republic of Austria
 Golden Medal of Honour of Salzburg
 Austrian Cross of Honour for Science and Art, 1st class (1997)
 Raoul Wallenberg International Humanitarian Award (1994)

Professional affiliations
 Governor of the United Nations Association of the United States
 Trustee of Case Western Reserve University 
 Member of the board of directors for the Institute for the Study of Diplomacy at Georgetown University
 Chairman of the American Austrian Foundation 
 Member of the Council on Foreign Relations
 Trustee of the Council on World Affairs

References

External links
Obituary 

1924 births
2005 deaths
20th-century American Jews
Ohio Democrats
Ohio State University College of Arts and Sciences alumni
Case Western Reserve University alumni
Businesspeople from Cleveland
American real estate businesspeople
Deaths from lymphoma
People from Shaker Heights, Ohio
Ambassadors of the United States to Austria
Recipients of the Grand Decoration with Sash for Services to the Republic of Austria
Recipients of the Austrian Cross of Honour for Science and Art, 1st class
20th-century American businesspeople
21st-century American Jews